Caca or CACA may refer to:
Caca (mythology), a Roman goddess
Cacá (footballer, born 1999), nickname of Brazilian footballer Carlos de Menezes Júnior
Cacá (footballer, born 1982), nickname of Brazilian footballer Lucas de Deus Santos
Cacá (footballer, born 1979), nickname of Brazilian footballer Carlos Eduardo Ferrari
Chinese American Citizens Alliance
(Z)-4-Amino-2-butenoic acid or CACA, a selective GABAC agonist

See also
Caca Bonita, a 1995 album by Papa Roach
, Latin for "to defecate" and the root of the slang term "caca"
Kaka (disambiguation)
libcaca, a software library that converts pixel information into colored ASCII art